Cincinnatus Town was initially a Christian neighborhood in Jamshed Town in Karachi, Sindh, Pakistan.

The planners
Pedro D'Souza and his colleague George Britto, the town planners designed Cincinnatus Town, with its front on Britto Road and the back on Seth Mahomed Ali Habib Road.

D'Souza was a brilliant engineer who studied in St. Xavier's College in Bombay. He died on December 31, 1912. He was buried in the Christian Cemetery Gora Kabristan in Karachi.

The city honoured the planners by naming Pedro D'Souza road and 
Britto Road after them.

The town
A description of the origin and history of Cincinnatus Town is cited in the book The Origin and Evolution of St. Lawrence's Parish.

The town was designed with a single lane road linking the new township to the Ismaili Jamaat Khana in Lea Market in 1880. D’Souza structured the colony with St Lawrence's Church at its centre.

Cincinnatus Town was considered to be one of the best planned districts of Karachi. There is a certain far sightedness in laying such broad streets in the precinct a century ago. D'Souza could not have visualised that the town he was designing would one day have high rise buildings in place of Goan style bungalows. Nor could he have conceived that camel carts and horse driven carriages would one day be replaced by buses and motor cars that would need the broad streets of his layout.

The town was named Cincinnatus, after the city of Cincinnati, in Ohio, USA, that as of 2012 had a large Portuguese population migrated from India and Pakistan, Mozambique and Angola. Although another source claims it was named after Goan administrator and politician Cincinatus Fabian D’Abreo.

The hard work and meticulous planning of D'Souza and Britto of Cincinnatus town has since the independence of Pakistan in 1947, benefitted not just the Goans, but Khojas, Ismailis and Memons as well. As of 2013, Cincinnatus Town remains mainly in the archives and the memories of its former residents. It was absorbed into a larger settlement and named Garden East.

School
 Jufelhurst School

References 

Neighbourhoods of Karachi
Former towns
Jamshed Town